Eugene Chan (or Eugene S.-L. Chan) is a linguist from Hong Kong who specializes in numeral systems of world languages. He is best known as the creator and curator of the Numeral Systems of the World's Languages database, which contains lists of numerals for over 5,000 of the world's languages. The database is currently the largest online collection of numerals in the world's languages.

Chan is affiliated with the Max Planck Institute for the Science of Human History.

Early life
Eugene Chan was born in Jinjing Township (金井鎮) in the city of Jinjiang, Fujian, China. He later moved to Hong Kong.

Books

References

External links
Official website
Numeralbank
Numeralbank on GitHub

Living people
People from Jinjiang, Fujian
Hong Kong linguists
Max Planck Institute for the Science of Human History
Year of birth missing (living people)